The Saginaw Valley High School Association (commonly referred to as the Saginaw Valley League) is a high school sports league formed in 1904 within the Michigan High School Athletic Association (MHSAA), located in the Bay, Genesee, Isabella, Lapeer, Midland, and Saginaw counties in Michigan area.

History
SVL was formed in the fall of 1904 with five teams: Bay City Eastern (Bay City Central), Bay City Western (Bay City Handy), Saginaw Eastern (Saginaw High), Arthur Hill, and Flint High (Flint Central).

In August 2012, the final four teams of the Big Nine Conference, Carman-Ainsworth, Davison, Flint Powers Catholic and Flushing, joined the league in its South Division. With the Flint Metro League losing Lapeer East and Lapeer West, Flushing and Carman-Ainsworth applied to join that league with Flushing's membership approved starting in the 2014-15 year.

Bay City John Glenn joined in 2017, but left in 2020. Grand Blanc joined in 2018.

Starting in 2021, Saginaw and Saginaw Arthur Hill formed a co-op team football in preparation of a high school merger. Traverse City Central and Traverse City West announced they would be joining the Red Division in 2022 as football-only members.

Member schools
The Saginaw Valley League currently has 14 member schools.

Current members

Former members

From 1969–1979, the Conference splint into a Saginaw Valley East and a Saginaw Valley West Conference.  Many Conference Realignments happened during this time.

Membership Timeline since 1950

List of Saginaw Valley League Conference Champions

Recent SVL Champions

Basketball

References

Michigan high school sports conferences
High school sports conferences and leagues in the United States